Riverside Theatre may refer to:

United States
 Riverside Theatre (Iowa)
 Riverside Theatre (Jacksonville)
Riverside Theater (Milwaukee), Wisconsin

Other countries
 Riverside Theatre, Coleraine, Northern Ireland
 Riverside Theatres Parramatta, Australia

See also 
 Riverside Theater (disambiguation)